Dineobellator (meaning Diné warrior, pronounced ) is a genus of dromaeosaurid theropod dinosaur that lived in North America during the Late Cretaceous period 68 million years ago. The remains have been found in the Maastrichtian stage of the Naashoibito Member at the Ojo Alamo Formation, New Mexico.

Discovery and naming

The holotype remains are designated SMP VP-2430 and were first recovered in 2008 from the Ojo Alamo Formation by Robert M. Sullivan, Steven E. Jasinski and James Nikas. Sullivan and Jasinski collected additional material in 2009. In 2011, the find was reported in the scientific literature. Further excavations were performed by Jasinski in 2015 and 2016.

The remains were realized as belonging to a new taxon, which was only named and described in 2020, by Jasinski, Sullivan and Peter Dodson. It was given the species name Dineobellator notohesperus; the generic name is derived from Diné, the Navajo word used for the people of the Navajo Nation, and bellator, the Latin word for warrior. The specific name is derived from the Greek noto~ (νότος) for southern or south, and hesperis (Ἑσπερίς), meaning western, together "southwest", in reference to the American Southwest.

Description

Dineobellator was a dromaeosaur similar in size to Velociraptor and Saurornitholestes. Unique features of the skeleton suggest greater hand and feet flexion than normal for dromaeosaurs, a tighter grip strength in the manual unguals, and greater movement at the tail base. These may aid in agility and predation. Additionally, the presence of quill knobs on the ulna suggest it was feathered, as assumed for all dromaeosaurids.

Classification
Phylogenetic analysis places Dineobellator in the Velociraptorinae. Its presence, along with that of Acheroraptor and Dakotaraptor, suggests dromaeosaurs were still diversifying by the end of the Cretaceous. The appearance of a second North American velociraptorine suggests the vicariance of these taxa in North America after a Campanian-Maastrichtian dispersal event. Below is the phylogenetic tree found by the authors:

However, two years later, Jasinski et al. 2022 re-examined the holotype, and found Dineobellator to be a member of Eudromaeosauria, but not within Velociraptorinae, Saurornitholestinae and Dromaeosaurinae.

Paleobiology 
One of the claws on the right hand of the type specimen of Dineobellator bears a gouge, the size of which is consistent with the claws of a similarly-sized theropod, possibly another Dineobellator. No evidence of healing is present, suggesting that the injury occurred close to the time of death. A broken and re-healed rib was also documented in the specimen.

Palaeoenvironment

Dineobellator is part of the Ojo Alamo Formation fauna in southern Laramidia, at the time a lush floodplain dominated by wetlands and riparian gymnosperm forests. It lived among alongside large dinosaurs like ceratopsians (Ojoceratops and Torosaurus), hadrosaurs (Edmontosaurus and Kritosaurus), two types of ankylosaur (including nodosaurid Glyptodontopelta), and the titanosaur Alamosaurus; smaller herbivorous and omnivorous dinosaurs in the ecosystem as of yet not known from any remains likely included thescelosaurine ornithopods like Thescelosaurus and pachycephalosaurs like Pachycephalosaurus. The top predators of the formation's ecosystem were the azhdarchid pterosaur Quetzalcoatlus and Tyrannosaurus. The presence of a dromaeosaur suggests that the dromaeosaurs were active predators that had discrete ecological niches even in the presence of large tyrannosaurs. Other theropods Dineobellator co-existed with were the caenagnathid Ojoraptorsaurus, ornithomimids, and troodontids, as well as Richardoestesia of uncertain affinity. Meanwhile, there are at least eight remains of mammals from the formation, such as Alphadon, Essonodon, Mesodma, and Meniscoessus, while there are five (possibly seven) types of turtle remains (Aspideretoides, Compsemys, Hoplochelys, Neurankylus, Plastomenus, and possibly Adocus and Basilemys), and four remains of fish (including Myledaphus, Squatirhina, and possibly Lepisosteus) all of which could be inferred to be common prey items for Dineobellator.

Also living at the same time as Dineobellator were Archeroraptor and Dakotaraptor, which were also dromaeosaurs.

References

External links
 

Fossil taxa described in 2020
Late Cretaceous dinosaurs of North America
Eudromaeosaurs
Paleontology in New Mexico
Maastrichtian genus first appearances
Maastrichtian genus extinctions